The Mountain of the Cannibal God (Italian title: La montagna del dio cannibale) is a 1978 Italian horror film starring Ursula Andress and Stacy Keach, with English dialogue, that was filmed in Sri Lanka. The film was also widely released in the U.S. in 1979 as Slave of the Cannibal God from New Line Cinema and released in the U.K. as Prisoner of the Cannibal God, with a poster designed by Sam Peffer. The film was banned in the U.K. until 2001 for its graphic violence and considered a "video nasty."

Plot
Susan Stevenson (Ursula Andress) is trying to find her missing anthropologist husband, Henry (Tom Felleghy), in the jungles of New Guinea. She and her brother, Arthur (Antonio Marsina), enlist the services of Professor Edward Foster (Stacy Keach), who thinks her husband might have headed for the mountain Ra Ra Me, which is located just off the coast on the island of Roka.

The locals believe that the mountain is cursed, and the authorities will not allow expeditions there, so the searchers surreptitiously enter the jungle to commence the search. They eventually make it to the island, and after a few run-ins with some unfriendly anacondas, alligators and tarantulas, they meet another jungle explorer named Manolo (Claudio Cassinelli) who has been staying at a nearby mission camp, who agrees to join them in their expedition.

Matters become complicated when it becomes evident that all of them have their own private reasons for coming to the island, none of which include finding Susan's missing husband. Susan and Arthur are secretly looking for uranium deposits, and Foster reveals that he has come there because he had been on the island a few years previously, was taken captive by a tribe of primitive cannibals, and has only returned to wipe them out if they still exist. Foster later dies while climbing up a waterfall.

Upon arriving at the mountain, Arthur is killed and Manolo and Susan are captured by the cannibals and taken to their cave. There they find the natives worshiping the skeletal remains of Susan's husband. The natives can hear Henry's Geiger counter ticking and believe it to be his heart still beating. They worship Henry as their Cannibal God, and find a photo of him and Susan as a couple. As a result, Susan is spared, and the cannibals feast on other human and reptile flesh. She is stripped naked, bound at the wrists to a pole, and have her entire body smeared with an orange cream by two native girls. At first, it seems this is to be a session of honey torture, but instead Susan is turned into a Cannibal Goddess after tasting and eating Arthur's cooked remains. Manolo is tied up and tortured, while the others are eaten. One of the cannibals attempts to rape Susan while no one is looking, but is caught and castrated as punishment. Manolo and Susan eventually escape, having endured their ordeals.

Cast
Ursula Andress – Susan Stevenson
Stacy Keach – Edward Foster
Claudio Cassinelli – Manolo
Antonio Marsina – Arthur Weisser
Franco Fantasia – Father Moses
Dudley Wanaguru – Government officer

Production

The film was shot on location in Sri Lanka.

Release

The Mountain of the Cannibal God was released in Italy on August 10, 1978. The film was not seen in the U.S. until 1979 from New Line Cinema.

Critical reception 

The Monthly Film Bulletin called it a "spiced up dish of left overs" plot-wise, but said the location filming gave it "authenticity". 
Allmovie gave the film a negative review, writing,  "a graphic and unpleasant film, with all the noxious trademarks intact: gratuitous violence, real-life atrocities committed against live animals and an uncomfortably imperialist attitude towards underprivileged peoples." Andrew Smith from Popcorn Pictures awarded the film a score of 4/10, writing, "Mountain of the Cannibal God merely goes through the usual Italian cannibal exploitation film motions, only this time with the bonus of a famous cast. More professionally made but lacking the raw, nihilistic punch of some of its counterparts, it's neither the best of this sub-genre, nor the worst either." Anya Stanley from Daily Grindhouse called the film 'problematic", citing the film's depictions of animal cruelty and "imperialist attitudes towards indigenous populations". However, Stanley commended the film's occasionally beautiful cinematography, and called it "one of the more cohesive cannibal films, that utilizes the flesh feast as more of a flourish than a crutch."

The film is often compared to H. Rider Haggard's novel The People of the Mist.

References

External links 
 
 
 

1978 films
1970s adventure films
1978 horror films
English-language Italian films
Films about hunter-gatherers
Films directed by Sergio Martino
Italian horror films
Cannibal-boom films
1970s Italian-language films
Films shot in Sri Lanka
Films set in Papua New Guinea
Films produced by Luciano Martino
New Line Cinema films
1970s Italian films
Video nasties